Dying Room Only is a 1973 American made-for-television horror mystery thriller film directed by Philip Leacock and starring Cloris Leachman and Ross Martin. Written by Richard Matheson and based on his 1953 short story of the same name, the film follows a woman whose husband disappears after they stop by a rural diner in the Arizona desert.

Produced by Lorimar Productions, who was also in charge of many television films of the period, Dying Room Only had its world premiere broadcast on ABC as a Tuesday movie of the week on September 18, 1973. It was later released on VHS, and eventually DVD by the Warner Archive Collection.

Plot
Bob Mitchell and his wife, Jean, are driving through the hot Arizona desert on their way home to Los Angeles. A detour has taken them 100 miles out of the way down a deserted road because Jean insisted on taking photographs of a particular area to take back to their daughter. Bob is irritated by the delay in getting home and, after he throws a few jabs at Jean, the two stop at a roadside cafe/inn called the Arroyo Motel. It's a rundown claptrap and, aside from cook Jim Cutler and one customer named Tom King, the place is empty. But the two travelers are hungry, and the diner will do for now. To their surprise, both Jim and Tom are hostile and downright rude to them. The situation makes Jean uncomfortable. She tries to call home using the payphone but the line is busy.

Jean gets up to go to the restroom and wash her face. When she returns, Bob is nowhere to be found. Perhaps he went to use the bathroom himself, she thinks. Their station wagon is still parked outside. Minutes pass and still no Bob. A tight-lipped Jim and Tom are extremely unhelpful, telling Jean that Bob probably just abandoned her. At Jean's request, Tom agrees to go into the men's room to see if her husband is alright. When Tom emerges, he tells Jean that Bob isn't there.

Jean goes next door to the motel, where a woman named Vi works the front desk. She's also vaguely unfriendly and of no help. Unbeknownst to Jean, hurried calls are being made between Vi and Jim in the diner. Starting to worry even more, Jean tries to go inside the cafe men's room, but it is locked. Jim finally opens the door when Jean threatens to call the police. Bob isn't around but she does notice a second door. The cook refuses to open it for her, and Jean contacts the police. Meanwhile, someone drives off in the Mitchell station wagon and Jean runs out screaming for her husband.

Night has now fallen, and the sheriff arrives. As Jean tells her story, the officer looks bewildered. In fact, the door to the men's room isn't locked. The other door inside leads to an old storage shed, but there’s still no trace of Bob. An APB is put out for the car, and Jean plans on staying in the motel until further notice from the sheriff. Neither Jim nor Vi are particularly happy to have her hang around. Despite Jean's plea for him to check out the other rooms, the sheriff doesn't see any cause to do so.

Later, Vi refuses to place a call to the FBI, and Jean is unable reach her home in Los Angeles. Jean confronts Vi and tells her, "I don't know what's going on here, but I will find out!" The now-frantic wife has no choice but to search around the motel by herself. She enters the shed behind the men's room. Peeking through the keyhole into the restroom beyond, she spies Tom entering on the other side and immediately notices a light bulb illuminate next to her. A third man must have been hiding in the shed when Bob entered the restroom; the bulb must have served as an alert to the kidnapper that it was time to nab her husband, leaving Tom and Jim free to distract her as they carried out their plan.

At that moment, Jean is relieved to see the family vehicle pull up. But instead of Bob stepping out, she is frightened by a tall, hulking character with a limp. She runs into some underbrush, and, when Tom comes near her, she whacks him with a stick. Then at last, she catches a glimpse of her husband: bound and gagged, he's being shuffled into the station wagon and driven away.

The sheriff returns, and this time he believes her story. The two drive through the desert towards an abandoned pump station, while Tom follows. The sheriff tells her that the man with the limp is named Lou McDermott and that he recently jumped parole. He also discloses that there have been other mysterious disappearances, a fact he neglected to tell Jean earlier. At the gas station, the sheriff shoots and kills Lou, and then the officer himself is snuffed out by Tom. Jean grabs the steering wheel of the police vehicle and tries to run Tom down, but she's caught.

Both Bob and Jean are taken back to the motel and are kept in Tom's truck until the three perpetrators can figure out what to do. Vi turns on Tom and shoots him. As Vi comes towards the truck with gun in hand, Jean lights a flare and blinds her. Jean then grabs the revolver and holds both Vi and Jim at bay until the authorities arrive. Now safe, Jean places a tearful call to her children and tells her daughter they had a "fine time" on their trip and that they’re coming home as fast as they can.

Cast

Production
Although set in Arizona, the film was shot on location in Borrego Springs, California, in 1973.

Release
Dying Room Only had its world premiere on ABC as part of the network's Movie of the Week series, airing for the first time on September 18, 1973. Although the film was praised for its acting and cinematography, it did receive feminist criticism for its positioning of Leachman's character as a "helpless woman" who has had her "selfhood stolen" when she loses her husband. In review after its world broadcast, Jack Friedman of The Village Voice criticized the film, saying, "The only frightening aspect of this tale of horror was that its latent hatred (class, regional, sexual) were being spewed all across the country. And the loam out there is rich enough already."

After its premiere in 1973, the film became a staple of late night TV, airing erratically throughout the 1970s and 1980s.

Home media
It was also released on VHS, and later on DVD in 2010 through the Warner Archive Collection.

See also
 List of American films of 1973

References

External links

1973 films
1973 horror films
1973 television films
1970s mystery films
ABC Movie of the Week
American horror thriller films
Films about missing people
Films based on works by Richard Matheson
Films scored by Charles Fox
Films set in Arizona
Films shot in San Diego
Films with screenplays by Richard Matheson
Films directed by Philip Leacock
American horror television films
Television films based on short fiction
1970s English-language films
1970s American films